Sir William Fairbairn (1789–1874) was a Scottish engineer.

William Fairbairn may also refer to:

William E. Fairbairn (1885–1960), British soldier and police officer
William Fairbairn & Sons, an engineering works in Manchester, England
Bill Fairbairn (born 1947), ice hockey player
William Alexander Fairbairn (1902–1984), British forester and ornithologist
William Ronald Dodds Fairbairn (1889–1964), member of the British Psychoanalytical Society

See also
Fairbairn (disambiguation)
William (disambiguation)